Rainbow Springs is an unincorporated community and census-designated place (CDP) in southwestern Marion County, Florida, United States. It is named for the first-magnitude artesian spring found in the community. U.S. Route 41 passes through the CDP, leading south  to Dunnellon and north  to Williston.

The community was first listed as a CDP for the 2020 census, at which time it had a population of 5,091.

Demographics

References 

Census-designated places in Marion County, Florida
Census-designated places in Florida